Scaphiella is a genus of spiders in the family Oonopidae. It was first described in 1892 by Simon. , it contains 62 species.

Species
Scaphiella comprises the following species:
Scaphiella agocena Chickering, 1968
Scaphiella almirante Platnick & Dupérré, 2010
Scaphiella altamira Platnick & Dupérré, 2010
Scaphiella antonio Platnick & Dupérré, 2010
Scaphiella arima Platnick & Dupérré, 2010
Scaphiella ayacucho Platnick & Dupérré, 2010
Scaphiella barroana Gertsch, 1941
Scaphiella bocas Platnick & Dupérré, 2010
Scaphiella bonda Platnick & Dupérré, 2010
Scaphiella bopal Platnick & Dupérré, 2010
Scaphiella bordoni Dumitrescu & Georgescu, 1987
Scaphiella bryantae Dumitrescu & Georgescu, 1983
Scaphiella buck Platnick & Dupérré, 2010
Scaphiella campeche Platnick & Dupérré, 2010
Scaphiella capim Platnick & Dupérré, 2010
Scaphiella cata Platnick & Dupérré, 2010
Scaphiella cayo Platnick & Dupérré, 2010
Scaphiella ceiba Platnick & Dupérré, 2010
Scaphiella chone Platnick & Dupérré, 2010
Scaphiella cocona Platnick & Dupérré, 2010
Scaphiella curlena Chickering, 1968
Scaphiella cymbalaria Simon, 1892
Scaphiella etang Platnick & Dupérré, 2010
Scaphiella gracia Platnick & Dupérré, 2010
Scaphiella guatopo Platnick & Dupérré, 2010
Scaphiella guiria Platnick & Dupérré, 2010
Scaphiella hitoy Platnick & Dupérré, 2010
Scaphiella hone Platnick & Dupérré, 2010
Scaphiella icabaru Platnick & Dupérré, 2010
Scaphiella incha Platnick & Dupérré, 2010
Scaphiella irmaos Platnick & Dupérré, 2010
Scaphiella kalunda Chickering, 1968
Scaphiella kartabo Platnick & Dupérré, 2010
Scaphiella lancetilla Platnick & Dupérré, 2010
Scaphiella longkey Platnick & Dupérré, 2010
Scaphiella maculata Birabén, 1955
Scaphiella manaus Platnick & Dupérré, 2010
Scaphiella meta Platnick & Dupérré, 2010
Scaphiella mico Platnick & Dupérré, 2010
Scaphiella miranda Platnick & Dupérré, 2010
Scaphiella muralla Platnick & Dupérré, 2010
Scaphiella murici Platnick & Dupérré, 2010
Scaphiella napo Platnick & Dupérré, 2010
Scaphiella osa Platnick & Dupérré, 2010
Scaphiella pago Platnick & Dupérré, 2010
Scaphiella palenque Platnick & Dupérré, 2010
Scaphiella palmillas Platnick & Dupérré, 2010
Scaphiella penna Platnick & Dupérré, 2010
Scaphiella pich Platnick & Dupérré, 2010
Scaphiella saba Platnick & Dupérré, 2010
Scaphiella scutiventris Simon, 1893
Scaphiella septella Chickering, 1968
Scaphiella simla Chickering, 1968
Scaphiella tena Platnick & Dupérré, 2010
Scaphiella tigre Platnick & Dupérré, 2010
Scaphiella tuxtla Platnick & Dupérré, 2010
Scaphiella valencia Platnick & Dupérré, 2010
Scaphiella vicencio Platnick & Dupérré, 2010
Scaphiella virgen Platnick & Dupérré, 2010
Scaphiella vito Platnick & Dupérré, 2010
Scaphiella weberi Chickering, 1968
Scaphiella williamsi Gertsch, 1941

References

Oonopidae
Araneomorphae genera
Spiders of North America
Spiders of South America